Skölsta is a locality situated in Uppsala Municipality, Uppsala County, Sweden with 344 inhabitants in 2010. The narrow-gauge heritage railroad Upsala-Lenna Jernväg has a stop in Skölsta, with a manual signal which passengers can use to signal the train to stop.

References 

Populated places in Uppsala County
Populated places in Uppsala Municipality